Rod Fergusson is a Canadian video game producer, best known for overseeing the development of the Gears of War franchise, originally at Epic Games and then as head of The Coalition. More recently, Fergusson moved over to Blizzard Entertainment to oversee development on the Diablo series.

Career

Early years and Microsoft (1996–2005)
Fergusson grew up in Ontario, Canada, and while he had an interest in video games, he thought the industry was too far out of reach for him, though he had programmed his own multi-user dungeon (MUD).

Fergusson started his career in 1996 at Microsoft, initially as part of its consulting services providing technical support to enterprise customers with Microsoft Solutions Framework before moving into the Redmond campus directly.  While there, an opening at Microsoft Game Studios under Shannon Loftis opened up, which Fergusson was able to get. He joined Microsoft's internal simulations group, later renamed to Aces Game Studio, where one of the first projects he worked on was Microsoft Train Simulator alongside Kuju Entertainment. With the release of the first Xbox console in 2002, Fergusson also worked with Stormfront Studios to help finish Blood Wake as a launch title for the console. After a few months exploring a possible new internal studio within Microsoft, Fergusson returned to a producer role to help bring Valve's Counter-Strike to the Xbox, as the project at Ritual Entertainment was behind schedule. He helped to bring the multiplayer game to the Xbox by 2003, and assisted in setting pace for the single-player Counter-Strike: Condition Zero to be completed by 2003, though ultimately, Valve dropped much of Ritual's work and had the single-player game reworked by Turtle Rock Studios.

Epic Games (2005–2012)
Between 2003 and 2005, Fergusson worked on two unannounced titles within Microsoft. In early 2005, Fergusson was introduced to the upcoming Gears of War from Epic Games, targeted for Microsoft's new Xbox 360 console. Fergusson described the state of the game as being "on fire" and well behind schedule, which he attributed to Epic having only one producer at the time, splitting duties between Gears and Unreal Tournament 3. Fergusson discussed the situation with Microsoft where it was determined the best route would be for him to quit Microsoft and join Epic in a full-time capacity to help get Gears back on track, and by July 2005, Fergusson was working at Epic as an executive producer and helping to get the game ready for release over the next 18 months. Eventually Fergusson became director of production, participating in development for the entire Gears of War series. While at Epic, Fergusson also helped with some of its other projects, including Bulletstorm which was also a similarly-troubled project as it neared its release window.

Another project at Epic that Fergusson helped with was the mobile game series Infinity Blade that was conceived by Donald Mustard of Epic's subsidiary Chair Entertainment. While Fergusson had partially helped with the design, he "[didn't] get mobile" and games that focused on endless repetition of gameplay. Around 2012, Epic began discussions with Tencent Holdings as the company wanted to get into the mobile and free-to-play market, an area Tencent had great experience in. In June 2012, Tencent invested into Epic Games as to obtain a 40% minority ownership of the company, but which Epic CEO Tim Sweeney said would not affect the creative output of Epic Games.

Irrational Games (2012–2013)
Fergusson, believing that this investment by Tencent would move Epic away from the type of "AAA, big-narrative, big-story, big-impact game" he preferred working on, left Epic and on August 9, 2012, joined Irrational Games as executive vice president of development during the final stretch of development of BioShock Infinite. Fergusson had gained a reputation from his days at Microsoft and Epic as a "closer", a management-level position that would help bring a troubled project to completion. He was brought into this same role at Irrational as to assist the game's lead, Ken Levine, to make tough decisions on what content and gameplay that they needed to cut as to deliver the game following nearly a decade of development.

Following BioShock Infinite release in March 2013, Fergusson announced his plans to depart Irrational that April, though had not confirmed where he would go next and was remaining there for a few months to help on transition. Fergusson said "I am very proud of the work that I did and of the team and what they were able to accomplish on Infinite. Now with the game shipped successfully, I've done what I set out to do here and now I'm looking forward to the next chapter in my life and career." Fergusson later said in a 2020 interview that the short period he had spent at Irrational validated the concept that he was a good "closer", someone capable of helping to complete a troubled project to get it released on time, and for which had begun to get an industry reputation for. Fergusson said that he found himself enjoying helping to close out the development cycle of games. In September 2013, Fergusson had been tapped to lead an upcoming new studio under 2K Games (Irrational's parent) in the San Francisco area. Fergusson later identified this studio as Hangar 13 and had been working on Mafia III. He decided to leave due to having creative differences with the senior management at 2K.

Black Tusk/The Coalition (2014–2020)
During 2013, Microsoft began talking with Epic about acquiring the Gears of War franchise with plans to assign it to Black Tusk Studios. Fergusson heard of this and contacted Microsoft, eager to work on the series again. Microsoft affirmed the acquisition on January 27, 2014, and confirmed Fergusson would be hired into a leadership position at Black Tusk Studios. Fergusson said "I've been privileged to work on a lot of great games with a lot of great teams, but Gears has had the most impact on me professionally and personally, so this really feels like a homecoming." Fergusson also state that he felt that with Microsoft's resources, they would do much more with the series than at Epic.  Black Tusk was later renamed to The Coalition (based on a fictional entity within the Gears series) in June 2015. Over the next three years, Fergusson helped lead development on the remastered version of the first Gears game and the fourth and fifth entry in the series. The last two games shifted the main character and setting for the game, which Fergusson said was meant to be comparable to the contrast between Tim Burton's and Christopher Nolan's Batman films.

Blizzard (2020–present) 
Fergusson left the Coalition in February 2020, moving over to Blizzard Entertainment to oversee development of the Diablo series.

Video game credits 
Fergusson has been credited on the following games:
 2001 – Microsoft Train Simulator
 2002 – Blood Wake
 2003 – Half-Life: Counter-Strike for Xbox
 2006 – Gears of War
 2007 – Unreal Tournament 3
 2008 – Gears of War 2
 2009 – Fat Princess - credited for some design help
 2009 – Shadow Complex
 2010 – Lost Planet 2 - due to Gears characters as part of the game's additional content
 2010 – Infinity Blade
 2011 – Gears of War 3
 2011 – Infinity Blade II
 2011 – Bulletstorm
 2013 – Gears of War: Judgment
 2013 – Infinity Blade III
 2013 – BioShock Infinite
 2016 – Gears of War 4
 2019 – Gears 5
 2021 – Diablo II: Resurrected - credited for leading the Diablo team

References

External links 

 

Living people
Microsoft employees
Video game producers
Epic Games
Gears of War
Year of birth missing (living people)
Blizzard Entertainment people